Rennell/Tingoa Airport is an airport in Tigoa on Rennell Island in the Solomon Islands .

Airlines and destinations

References

External links
Solomon Airlines Routes

Airports in the Solomon Islands
Rennell and Bellona Islands